Ruido Fest   is an annual multi-day Latin American music festival in Chicago, Illinois held every July in Addams/Medill Park in Chicago's Near West Side neighborhood.

Ruido Fest was first  held July 10–12, 2015. The festival features "Latin post punk, electronic, hip-hop, rock, psychedelia, tropicalia, reggae and punk acts from all over the American continent and world". It is Chicago's only 3-day Latin alternative music festival.  Ruido Fest 2019 will be the festival's fifth year. Ruido is the Spanish word for "noise".

Founding 
Ruido Fest was founded in 2015 by a team of partners that include Chicago production company Metronome Chicago, alternative music festival Riot Fest Presents, Star Events, and Latin alternative music promoter Rock Sin Anestesia. Ruido Fest is the first large Latin American alternative music festival of its kind in America. Owner of Metronome Chicago, Max Wagner said of the decision to make a Latin American music festival: "We are seeking to create a destination for Latin alternative music, not only for the people of this great festival city, but also for fans of quality Latin entertainment across the nation.”

2021
After taking 2020 off due to the COVID-19 pandemic, Chicago's Ruido Fest welcomed festival-goers back to Union Park for the three-day event starting on August 20, 2021. The festival was headlined by Caifanes, Panteón Rococó, and Café Tacuba.

2017
Ruido Fest's third year was held   from July 7–9, 2017. The lineup included  Cultura Profética, Bomba Estéreo, Titán, Duncan Dhu, Desorden Público, Gepe, Adan Jodorowsky, Jessica Hernandez & the Deltas, Clubz, Silver Rose, Ácido Pantera, Molotov, Julieta Venegas, Los Amigos Invisibles, Silverio, Lucybell, A Band of Bitches, Javiera Mena, El Guincho, The Wookies, Camilo Séptimo, Sotomayor, Los Nastys, Extraperlo, Wet Baes, Intocable, Mon Laferte, Fobia, Álex Anwandter, Rostros Ocultos, Víctimas del DOCTOR Cerebro, Buscabulla, Pedrina y Rio, King Lil G, Simpson Ahuevo, Ruido Rosa, Las Piñas, and Disco las Palmeras! Mylko.
 
Many acts were performing  in Chicago for their first time.

Controversy
For marketing purposes, Home Depot set up a small wall  to allow Ruido Fest attendees to  decorate tiles and  try out a  product for laying tile; the wall stirred up emotions related to Trump's border wall and was criticized by attendees. The wall was dismantled. A Home Depot representative called the situation "an unfortunate misunderstanding" in a statement.

2016
Ruido Fest's second year was held   from July 8–10. The lineup  included Los Fabulosos Cadillacs, Maldita Vecindad, Aterciopelados, Panteón Rococó, Natalia Lafourcade, Carla Morrison, Los Pericos, La Santa Cecilia, Cuca, Miranda!, Los Cafres, Le Butcherettes, Silverio, Mexrrissey, Adan & Xavi, Altocamet, Ayer Amarillo, Banda de Turistas, Comisario Pantera, Dromedarios Magicos, Estelares Helado Negro, Hong Kong Blood Opera, Ibiza Pareo, Instituto Mexicano del Sonido, Izcalli, Killer Moon, Las Robertas, Lng Sht, Los Blenders, Los Vicios de Papa, Marineros, Minimal, Mon Laferte, Monoplasma, Odisseo, Riesgo de Contagio, Sexy Zebras, Urss Bajo El Arbol, Vaya Futuro, and Yokozuna.

2015
Ruido Fest's inaugural year was 2015. It was held   on July 10–12. The inaugural  lineup for Ruido Fest included Café Tacvba, Zoé, Molotov, Kinky, Ozomatli, Zero Kill, Nortec Collective, Mexican Institute of Sound, Enjambre, Porter, Estelates, Aj Davila & Terror Amor, Astro, Banda De Turistas, Bumbac Joe, Callate Mark, Cardiel, Carmen Costa, Ceci Bastida, Cumbia Machin, Dellarge, División Minúscula, Descartes A Kant, DJ Afro, Dos Santos Anti-Beat Orchestra, Esso! Afrojam Funk Beat, Hurakan, Jessy Bulbo, Kali Uchis, La Armada, La Vida Bohème, Los Aguas Aguas, Los Crema Paraiso, Los Rakas, Los Romanticos De Zacatecas, Master Blaster Sound System, Chicano Batman.

See also
Pilsen Fest
Spring Awakening
Riot Fest

References

External links

@ruidofest on Instagram

Music festivals in Chicago
Music festivals established in 2015
Alternative rock festivals
Electronic music festivals in the United States
West Side, Chicago